Lau Yui Ching (born 15 August 1994) is a Hongkonger footballer who plays as a midfielder for the Hong Kong women's national team.

Club career
Lau Yui Ching has played for Lung Moon in Hong Kong.

International career
Lau Yui Ching represented Hong Kong at the 2013 AFC U-19 Women's Championship qualification, the 2017 EAFF E-1 Football Championship, the 2018 AFC Women's Asian Cup qualification and the 2018 Asian Games.

See also
List of Hong Kong women's international footballers

References

1994 births
Living people
Hong Kong women's footballers
Women's association football midfielders
Hong Kong women's international footballers